One athlete from Romania, a trap shooter,  competed at the 1900 Summer Olympics in Paris, France.  It was the first appearance of the European nation, and only appearance until the 1924 Summer Olympics.

Results by event

Shooting

Each shooter fired at 20 targets, scoring 1 point for each target hit.

Romania was represented by one shooter in its debut.  He tied for 13th place in the trap shooting event.

References

Nations at the 1900 Summer Olympics
1900
Olympics